Rhabdosargus globiceps, the white stumpnose, is an endemic fish found on the southern African coast, from Angola to the Qora River just south of Port St Johns.

Description 
The fish is silver in color with 5 -7 dull horizontal stripes across the body. The fish grows to 50 cm in length and then weighs 2.8 kg. It is a tasty edible fish.

Habitat 
They occur in seawater with rocky areas and sandy bottoms, from the beach to a depth of 120 m. The fish cannot change sex. They spawn during the spring and summer near the coast.

References 

 Sea Fishes of Southern Africa. Rudy van der Elst & Dennis King. 2006. ISBN 978-1-77007-345-6.
 Gids tot die kusgebiede van Suid-Afrika. Jacana Media. 2007. ISBN 978-1-77009-215-0.
 Coastal Fishes of Southern Africa. Phil & Elaine Heemstra. 2004. ISBN 1-920033-01-7

External links 
 http://www.fishbase.org/summary/Rhabdosargus-globiceps.html

globiceps